Jesús Federico Reyes-Heroles González Garza is a Mexican economist and politician. He is a member of PRI and co-founder and executive president of "Grupo de Economistas y Asociados" (GEA), a consulting firm that has become the first independent organization dedicated to political and economic analysis. He holds a B.A. in Economics from ITAM and a Ph.D. in Economics from MIT.

Career
He studied Economics in Mexico and abroad, has entered the public sector when President Ernesto Zedillo chose him as Secretary of Energy in 1997 and left office when he was appointed Ambassador of Mexico in the United States until 2000.

Economist Autonomous Technological Institute of Mexico, and studied law at the UNAM.

PhD in Economics from the Massachusetts Institute of Technology.

In 2006 he publicly expressed his opposition to the nomination of the PRI Roberto Madrazo and support the candidate of the National Action Party for President of Mexico, Felipe Calderon Hinojosa, without renouncing his membership in the PRI, along with other former members of the Cabinet of Ernesto Zedillo as Luis Genaro Borrego Estrada and Téllez, who did leave the ranks of the tricolor.

In December 1994 he was nominated Director-General of the Banco Nacional de Obras y Servicios Públicos (BANOBRAS), the development bank for infrastructure. After this, he became Secretary of Energy in the Cabinet of President Ernesto Zedillo where he was also President of the Board of several governmental companies such as PEMEX, CFE and LyFC. Then he was appointed Mexican Ambassador to the United States from October 1997 to November 2000.

In December 2006, Felipe Calderón Hinojosa named Reyes Heroles as Director-General of PEMEX.  On September 8, 2009, he was relieved of this position.

References

External links
PEMEX Website

Mexican Secretaries of Energy
Mexican businesspeople in the oil industry
Mexican economists
Year of birth missing (living people)
Living people
Ambassadors of Mexico to the United States
Mexican business executives
Pemex
MIT School of Humanities, Arts, and Social Sciences alumni
20th-century Mexican businesspeople
21st-century Mexican businesspeople
Instituto Tecnológico Autónomo de México alumni